Pope Theonas of Alexandria was the 16th Pope and Patriarch of Alexandria, reigning from 282 to 300.

Life

Theonas was a scholar who built a church in Alexandria, Egypt dedicated to the name of the Virgin St. Mary, the Theotokos.

Until his time, the faithful were praying and performing their services in homes and in caves for fear of the unbelievers. Pope Theonas dealt with them wisely and gently to achieve what he wanted to do. He converted many of them to believe in the Lord Christ and baptized them.

He baptized, in the first year of his papacy, St. Peter, who succeeded him on the apostolic throne of St. Mark and was the 17th Pope. It was said that he ordained Peter as a reader at the age of five, then he promoted him to be a deacon at the age of twelve, then as a priest at sixteen.

At the time of this patriarch, a man by the name of Sabellius appeared in Alexandria who was teaching that the Father, the Son, and the Holy Spirit are one person. Theonas excommunicated him and he invalidated his heresy by convincing proof.

Butler's account

The hagiographer Alban Butler (1710–1773) wrote in his Lives of the Fathers, Martyrs, and Other Principal Saints under August 23,

References
 St. Theonas, 16th Pope of Alexandria.
 Theonas in the Ante-Nicene Fathers

Sources

 

3rd-century Popes and Patriarchs of Alexandria
300 deaths